Tabernaemontana laurifolia is a species of plant in the family Apocynaceae. It is found in the Cayman Islands and Jamaica.

References

laurifolia
Flora of Jamaica
Flora of the Cayman Islands
Flora without expected TNC conservation status